Maximum Ride is a series of young adult science fantasy novels by the author James Patterson. The series centers on the adventures of Maximum "Max" Ride and her family, called the Flock, who are winged human-avian hybrids created at a lab called, The School. The series is a reboot of Patterson's earlier novels When the Wind Blows and The Lake House, which were aimed for older audiences.

Plot

The Angel Experiment

Max, Fang, Iggy, Nudge, Gasman, and Angel are human-avian hybrids living in hiding. When Angel is abducted, the rest of the Flock searches for her while fighting a number of obstacles including physical ailments, natural disaster, the wolf-human Erasers, and the evil scientists at the experimental lab called "The School".

School's Out - Forever

The Flock travels to Washington, D.C., where they hope to find the answers to their origins. They are taken in by a former FBI agent and placed into a regular school system to live as "normal kids." Erasers attack the school, and the Flock must flee again to find safety. Max meets her murderous clone, Max II, and must battle with her. The Flock learns details about their creators, the Itexicon Corporation.

Saving the World and Other Extreme Sports

The Flock must stop the Itexicon Corporation, who plan to destroy half of the world's population. The boys and girls split after a disagreement, and work from separate angles to take down Itex and save the world. Max learns that Jeb Batchelder, the scientist with mysterious motivations, is her biological father.

The Final Warning

Government officials ask the Flock to help a team of scientists study pollution levels in the oceans around Antarctica. While there, a few members of the Flock are captured by the Uber-Director and taken to Florida. The rest of the group makes their way to rescue them and defeat this new villain in the midst of a hurricane. Max and Fang begin a romantic relationship.

MAX: A Maximum Ride Novel

The Flock is attacked by a group of bionic robots ("M-Geeks") at environmental awareness shows in Los Angeles and Mexico City. Later, the government enlists their help in finding out what is destroying hundreds of ships and killing millions of fish off the coast of Hawaii. Max's mother also goes missing. Max, Fang and the others make a submarine trip beneath the ocean, rescuing Max's mother and befriending undersea monsters.

Fang: A Maximum Ride Novel

The Flock travels to Africa where they meet Dr. Hans Gunther-Hagen, a former Itex worker, and Dylan, another human-avian hybrid designed to be Max's "perfect other half". Dylan joins the Flock, although they are all wary of his motives. Angel takes over the Flock, kicking out Max and Fang while claiming that they're too focused on their personal relationship. Fang is kidnapped by Dr. Hans and experimented on, and the Flock comes to rescue him. He dies for a moment before Max revives him. After getting back to their home, Fang decides to permanently leave the group and start his own Flock.

Angel: A Maximum Ride Novel

The Doomsday Group is brainwashing people, affecting Iggy and Max's half-sister Ella. Meanwhile, Fang starts his own gang which includes Max's clone, now called Maya. The two teams join forces in Paris to stop the Doomsday group. Their plan goes awry when Gazzy fails to disarm all the bombs under the gathering spot, and the bombs explode while Fang, Gazzy, and Angel are still in the blast radius. Fang and Gazzy make it out safely, but Angel is missing, leaving everyone heartbroken.

Nevermore: The Final Maximum Ride Adventure

Max and the remaining members of the Flock are attending a normal school, and Max is dating Dylan. Meanwhile, Fang's gang is attacked, some members betray them, and Maya is killed. Fang decides to return to the Flock. Together they learn of Angel's survival and rescue her from the lab where she's being held prisoner. Jeb Batchelder has returned trying to kill Fang, with help from a brainwashed Dylan. They fail, and Dr. Martinez leads the Flock to a remote island where they will be safe from the approaching apocalypse. However, instead of the plague they expect, the world is struck by a meteor. The Flock, along with the people on the island, survive and begin to rebuild.

This was supposed to be the last book in the series, but it was announced later that Maximum Ride Forever would be released in 2015.

Maximum Ride Forever
The Flock struggles to survive after the decimation of the planet, with many of their loved ones having died or gone missing. They split up after a tragedy, and Max begins investigating a new enemy called the Remedy and his Horsemen who are working to kill off the remaining population. In a final battle of good and evil, the Flock reunites with an army to defeat the Remedy. Max and Fang have a daughter, Phoenix, and after sheltering during a five-year-long nuclear winter, settle in the ruins of Machu Picchu.

Hawk 
Max and Fang's teenage daughter, who now goes by the name Hawk, lives in the post-apocalyptic "City of the Dead." Having been lost as a small child, she knows nothing about her family until she encounters the Flock while searching for her kidnapped friends. They free Max from the prison where she's been kept, rally the people of the city and defeat the corrupt leaders.

City of the Dead 
Max and her daughter Hawk team up to save the City of the Dead from a plague. Hawk sees a monster in the nearby forest and she decides to tell Langford, a member of the council. Hawk goes to the forest to investigate. After some failures she finds a hidden base of hybrids. Moke and Hawk get taken captured by the Renegades. Hawk gets away. Moke still captured finds his new ability. Tensions continue to rise with Hawk in the middle. Langford captures Hawk and Calypso and they trap Langford and get out.

The Renegades bringing a battery, that raises the temperature for the plague to take hold. The plague makes people turn against one another. Moke is chained to it and powering it with his ability. Hawk gets Pietro and the hybrids to fight the threats eventually beating them.

Main Characters

 Maximum "Max" Ride: the protagonist of the series, Max is an avian-human hybrid and the leader of the Flock. She is strong, reckless, and independent. She is Hispanic, and has brown wings and brown or blonde hair. Her powers include flying up to 350 mph, breathing water, and hearing a Voice in her head which gives her advice (which we find out later in the series is really Angel). 
 Fang: the second-in-command of the Flock and Max's best friend. Fang has dark hair and wings and has the abilities to virtually disappear, and the key to immortality in his DNA. He is somewhat reserved, but cares deeply about the Flock. He is usually very silent, and seems quite mysterious, always hiding his feelings. He runs a blog about the Flock's adventures. Fang and Max slowly fall in love over the course of the series. He splits from the Flock on several occasions after clashes with Max, but always returns.
 Hawk: the daughter of Max and Fang and the protagonist of the books Hawk and City of the Dead. Born after the Apocalypse and lost as a child, she grew up in an orphanage. She has black hair worn in a mohawk, and black and brown wings combining the feather colors of her parents. She has a rough and rebellious personality much like her mother.

Reception
Maximum Ride: The Angel Experiment received generally positive reviews. The School Library Journal called the book an "exciting SF thriller that's not wholly original but still a compelling read". Booklist described it as "an action-packed cross between Gertrude Chandler Warner's Boxcar Children and Marvel Comics' X-Men. John Ritchie of the ALAN Review wrote a negative review, saying that Patterson "slips in his attempt to write an action-adventure series for kids". He called the book "filled with every possible comic book/Saturday morning cartoon cliche" and described Patterson's writing style as "uneasy" and Max's dialogue as "horribly fake". In January 2010, the webcomic Penny Arcade poked fun at James Patterson based on the description found on the back of the first book.

The second book, Maximum Ride: School's Out Forever, was criticized for being "disappointingly anticlimactic and violent," although Total's character was praised for being "sure to entertain." Booklist delivered a positive review, praising Patterson's "ability to write page-turning action scenes" and noting that he "leaven[ed] the suspense with some surprising humor." It also mentioned that fans of the first book would be "delighted" with the sequel. Erin Collazo Miller from About.com praised the "fast-paced" novel, "fun characters," and "interesting premise," but criticized the characters and plot lines for "lack of depth and development." The review said that "[a]fter 400+ pages, readers may wish they were a little farther into the plot and that more of their questions had been answered."

Other works

OEL manga
Illustrated by Narae Lee and released by Yen Press, the first chapter of the original English-language manga adaptation came out in July 2008 in the magazine Yen Plus. A free 22-page preview was released on Free Comic Book Day (May 3, 2008). The first volume of the series was released on January 27, 2009, the second volume was released on October 27, 2009, the third volume was released on August 17, 2010, the fourth volume was released on April 26, 2011, the fifth volume was released on December 13, 2011, the sixth volume was released on December 11, 2012, the seventh volume was released on October 29, 2013, the eighth volume was released on July 29, 2014 and the ninth volume released on November 17, 2015. It was on the "Top 25 Manga Properties" list in 2012. No volumes have been released since 2015, leaving the series incomplete.

Film adaptation 

Plans for a film were first announced in September 2007. However, the film entered development hell with the resignation of director Catherine Hardwicke in 2012 and the death of screenplay writer Don Payne in 2013. In 2014, the series was submitted for adaptation into a web series by Collective Digital Studio. The completed film, starring Allie Marie Evans as Max, was released on Digital HD on August 30, 2016. It adapted the first half of The Angel Experiment, and was rated poorly by fans and critics alike.

Marvel Comic series
The Marvel Comics adaption Max Ride: First Flight debuted April 8, 2015. It featured the talents of Marguerite Bennett and Alex Sanchez. It was followed by Max Ride: Ultimate Flight beginning in November 2015, and Max Ride: Final Flight beginning in September 2016. Together, the comic series adapted the first three books of the series. There are significant differences from the books. Rather than avian wings, the characters have wings made of a metal alloy.

See also

References

External links 

Maximum Ride official website
Maximum Ride book page at James Patterson's official website
Maximum Ride at the Internet Movie Database
Maximum Ride at User Based Casting

 
Book series introduced in 2005
American adventure novels
American young adult novels
Fantasy novel series
Science fiction book series
Young adult fantasy novels